Independence from the United Kingdom may refer to any one of the many campaigns (both historical and current), events, documents and legislation regarding countries that have gained independence from the United Kingdom or countries which aspire to do so.

These include:
Afghani independence:
Anglo-Afghan Treaty of 1919
American independence:
American Revolution, during the 1770s
United States Declaration of Independence, 1776
Treaty of Paris (1783)
United States Constitution, 1788
Australian independence:
Constitution of Australia, 1901
Statute of Westminster 1931
 Statute of Westminster Adoption Act 1942
Australia Act 1986
Barbadian independence
Barbados Independence Act 1966
Canadian independence
Canadian Confederation, during the 1860s
Constitution Act, 1867
Statute of Westminster 1931
Canada Act 1982
Egyptian Independence
Unilateral Declaration of Egyptian Independence, 1922
Indian independence
Dominion of India, 1947
Irish independence (disambiguation)
Israeli independence:
Mandatory Palestine, 1920-1948
Israeli Declaration of Independence, 1948
Jamaican independence
Jamaica Independence Act 1962
New Zealand independence
Declaration of the Independence of New Zealand, 1835
New Zealand Constitution Act 1852
Dominion of New Zealand, 1907
Statute of Westminster 1931
Realm of New Zealand, 1947
Statute of Westminster Adoption Act 1947
Constitution Act 1986
Scottish independence
Scottish independence referendum, 2014
Welsh independence

See also
Balfour Declaration of 1926
Constitutional history of Australia
Sue v Hill#Australian independence from the United Kingdom
List of countries that have gained independence from the United Kingdom

History of the British Empire
Parliament of the United Kingdom